MediaOne TV is an Indian Malayalam-language television channel operated by Madhyamam Broadcasting Limited. The channel was licensed in September 2011 and was officially launched on 10 February 2013. The main studio is located at Velliparamba, Kozhikode, Kerala.

Broadcasting of the channel was halted by the Ministry of Information and Broadcasting (I&B) in February 2022 after MediaOne's license to distribute the channel was revoked due to national security issues. Some criticized the ban, which was upheld by a division bench of the Kerala High Court, as being based on undisclosed sealed information. Even though it did not broadcast to television providers, MediaOne continued to distribute its programming online and via social media. On 15 March 2022, the Supreme Court of India issued an interim order staying the ban on MediaOne and allowing it to resume broadcast operations.

History

Foundation
On 16 June 2012, then-Kerala Chief Minister Oommen Chandy inaugurated the foundation stone laying ceremony of MediaOne headquarters and studio complex at Velliparambu near Kozhikode, and former Union Cabinet Minister of Overseas Indian Affairs Vayalar Ravi unveiled the MediaOne logo at Kochi Le Meridian convention hall. The channel was officially launched on 10 February 2013 by former Defence Minister A. K. Antony at a gala function held at Swapna Nagari, Kozhikode.

Security issues and ban 
Madhyamam Broadcasting Limited, owners of MediaOne TV, first experienced a dispute with regulators in 2015. At that time, Madhyamam proposed a second MediaOne channel, to be known as MediaOne Life. However, the Ministry of Home Affairs (MHA) denied the security clearance that was necessary to start the new service. Even though the Ministry of Information and Broadcasting had approved the technical aspects of its application, this was dropped in 2019 due to the MHA's denial.  

In March 2020, I&B prohibited the transmission or re-transmission of MediaOne TV, along with Asianet News TV, for 48 hours for what it called for "biased" reporting of North East Delhi riots, stating that the channel was "airing attacks on religions or communities, promoting communal attitudes" and "inciting violence against law and order maintenance and promoting anti-national attitudes". In its ruling, I&B noted that the "channel's reporting on Delhi violence seems to be biased as it is deliberately focusing on the vandalism of CAA supporters [...] questions RSS and alleges Delhi Police inaction [... and] seems to be critical towards Delhi Police and RSS".

On 31 January 2022, MediaOne TV ceased broadcasts at noon after the Ministry of Information and Broadcasting refused to renew the channel's licence to operate in the wake of the MHA's revocation of the security clearance for Madhyamam Broadcasting Limited. MediaOne TV is one of the few Indian news channels whose ownership lies with an Islamic organization.

On 8 February 2022, the Kerala High Court upheld the order passed by the Union Ministry of Information and Broadcasting to revoke the broadcasting license granted to MediaOne TV. The Court dismissed the writ petition filed by Maadhyamam Broadcasting Ltd challenging the Union's decision. 

Justice N. Nagaresh held that, after perusing the files from the Union Ministry of Home Affairs, there were intelligence inputs that justified the denial of security clearance to the channel:

An editorial in The Hindu criticized the ban for being based on sealed, classified information, without MediaOne being made aware of its contents, as did another in The Indian Express.

On 2 March 2022, the division bench of Kerala High Court upheld the earlier order. It noted that "there are certain serious adverse reports by the Intelligence Bureau against Madhyamam Broadcasting Ltd and its managing director", and though the files did not provide much information as to the dimensions of the issue, the bench indicated that "there are clear and significant indications impacting the public order and security of the state". MediaOne appealed its decision to the Supreme Court of India, alleging that the guidelines for uplinking and downlinking television channels did not require MHA permission at renewal but only upon application for new service.

The Supreme Court stayed the ban and permitted MediaOne to resume operations under an interim order on 15 March 2022, at which time its management announced it would continue broadcasting as it had before the ban was imposed. The three-judge bench's ruling noted that the company was "surely entitled" to know the reasons for the decision; the central government was ordered to file a counter affidavit by 26 March. On 3 November, the Supreme Court reserved judgment in the case after two days of hearings.

 Awards and recognitions 

 Aneesh Ravi won the Best Anchor award at the Kerala State Television Awards 2013 for the programme Cucumber City.
 Sunil Baby and Sajith Ajmal of MediaOne were selected the best investigative journalists for the programme Truth Inside (The death of a river) in Kerala State Television Awards 2013.
 MediaOne TV was presented five awards in the state television awards for the year 2016, including best news presenter, best anchor, and best show.

 Criticism and controversies 
In February–March 2014, Gail Tredwell, a former disciple and closest personal attendant of Mata Amritanandamayi, released an autobiography titled Holy Hell: A Memoir of Faith, Devotion, and Pure Madness. She alleged that a senior follower of Amritanandamayi's ashram, Balu, had sexual relationships with her and Amritanandamayi for many years and that Amritanandamayi was abusive toward her. The mainstream media of Kerala was reluctant to report about the allegations made in the book. In accordance with an order from Ernakulam judicial first magistrate court, on 11 March 2014, Kerala Police registered a case against five media organizations—Indiavision, Reporter, MediaOne, and newspapers Thejas and Madhyamam''—in response to a petition that accused these organizations of airing unverified statements.

On 7 November 2022, Kerala governor Arif Mohammed Khan barred MediaOne TV and Kairali News from covering his press meeting in Kochi, accusing their representatives of being "political persons" who "masquerade as media".

Notes

References

External links

Malayalam-language television channels
Television channels and stations established in 2013
2013 establishments in Kerala
Television stations in Kerala